Rockwell is a ghost town in Norton County, Kansas, United States.

History
The community was initially named Bell, then later as Rockwell City.

Bell was issued a post office in 1879. The post office was renamed Rockwell City in 1884, then discontinued in 1904.

References

Former populated places in Norton County, Kansas
Former populated places in Kansas